USS Chatterer (AMS-40/YMS-415) was a  acquired by the U.S. Navy for the task of removing mines that had been placed in the water to prevent ships from passing.

History
Chatterer was laid down, 5 October 1943 by the Stadium Yacht Basin Inc., Cleveland, Ohio; launched, 15 April 1944; completed and commissioned USS YMS-415, 1 October 1944.

She was assigned to the Pacific Ocean, where she participated in operations off Okinawa in June 1945. Following the Japanese surrender, YMS-415 was active in mine clearance efforts in the vicinity of Japan.

She was named Chatterer and reclassified as a motor minesweeper, AMS-40, 11 March 1947. Stationed in Japan when the Korean War began in June 1950, Chatterer soon joined the effort to search for and clear enemy mine field's in the combat zone. She was retained in the Western Pacific after the conflict ended and was redesignated as a coastal minesweeper, Old, MSC(O)-40, 7 February 1955.

Chatterer was transferred to Japan 16 April 1955 as Yurishima (MSC 661); in the Japanese Maritime Self-Defense Force; Returned to the U.S. Navy in 1967; Sold for scrap 1 May 1968.

References

External links 
 

YMS-1-class minesweepers of the United States Navy
Ships built in Cleveland
1944 ships
World War II minesweepers of the United States
Korean War minesweepers of the United States
YMS-1-class minesweepers of the Japan Maritime Self-Defense Force